Jacinto S. Cayco (1924/5 – 17 February 2021) was a Filipino swimmer and referee who competed in the 1948 Summer Olympics. He also had a brother named, Pedro who competed in the 1956 Summer Olympics.

Cayco won two gold medals at the 1951 Asian Games; one at the 200 meters breaststroke event and the other was won with Nurhatab Rajab and Artemio Salamat at the 3x100 medley relay. At the 1954 Asian Games he was captain of the swimming team. At the 1958 Asian Games he won a silver medal at the 4x100 medley relay with three other swimmers.

He was also a varsity player of the University of Santo Tomas swimming team from 1946 to 1953. After his competitive stint as a swimmer he became a referee. As a referee he officiated at the 1981 Southeast Asian Games and in national-level competitions such as the Palarong Pambansa, Philippine National Games, and Batang Pinoy. Cayco was named into the Philippine Sports Hall of Fame on 25 January 2016. He died on 17 February 2021 at the age of 96.

References

External links
 

1920s births
2021 deaths
Filipino male swimmers
Olympic swimmers of the Philippines
Swimmers at the 1948 Summer Olympics
Asian Games medalists in swimming
Swimmers at the 1951 Asian Games
Swimmers at the 1958 Asian Games
Medalists at the 1951 Asian Games
Medalists at the 1958 Asian Games
University of Santo Tomas alumni
Asian Games gold medalists for the Philippines
Asian Games silver medalists for the Philippines
Male breaststroke swimmers
Year of birth missing
Date of birth missing
Place of birth missing
Place of death missing
Philippine Sports Hall of Fame inductees